Yves Le Goff (25 February 1907 – 11 August 1988) was a French racing cyclist. He rode in the 1932 Tour de France.

References

1907 births
1988 deaths
French male cyclists
Place of birth missing